The following lists events that happened during 1910 in New Zealand.

Incumbents

Regal and viceregal
Head of State – Edward VII (until 6 May), succeeded by George V
Governor – The Lord Plunket GCMG KCVO, succeeded the same year by The Lord Islington GCMG GBE DSO PC

Government
The 17th New Zealand Parliament continued.

Speaker of the House – TBD
Prime Minister – TBD
Minister of Finance – TBD (Labour)
Chief Justice – Sir Robert Stout

Parliamentary opposition
Leader of the Opposition – William Massey (Reform Party).

Main centre leaders
Mayor of Auckland – Charles Grey then Lemuel Bagnall
Mayor of Wellington – Thomas Wilford
Mayor of Christchurch – Charles Allison
Mayor of Dunedin – James Walker, then Thomas Cole

Events 
 February – March: Field Marshal Kitchener tours New Zealand and makes a report to the Government on the defence of New Zealand.
 5 July: Herbert Pither reportedly makes a flight of "nearly a mile" at Riverton Beach.

Undated
Aero Club of New Zealand is formed in Auckland.
 Foundation of Eastwoodhill Arboretum at Ngatapa, Gisborne by William Douglas Cook

Arts and literature

See 1910 in art, 1910 in literature

Music

See: 1910 in music

Film

See: 1910 in film, List of New Zealand feature films, Cinema of New Zealand

Sport

Chess
The 23rd National Chess Championship was held in Auckland, and was won by J. Mason of Wellington.

Golf
 The fourth New Zealand Open championship was held at Christchurch golf club and was won by amateur Arthur Duncan, his second win.
 The 18th National Amateur Championships were held in Christchurch
 Men: H.B. Lusk (Christchurch)
 Women: Miss ? Collins.

Horse racing

Harness racing
 New Zealand Trotting Cup: Wildwood Junior – 2nd win
 Auckland Trotting Cup: Floranz

Rugby league
 Great Britain tour of New Zealand – beat New Zealand 52–20 in Auckland

Rugby union
 Auckland defend the Ranfurly Shield against Hawkes Bay (11–3), Wellington (3–3), Taranaki (16–9) and Canterbury (6–4)

Soccer
Provincial league champions:
	Auckland:	Caledonian Auckland
	Canterbury:	Burnham IS
	Otago:	Northern Dunedin
	Southland:	Nightcaps
	Taranaki:	New Plymouth
	Wellington:	Ramblers Wellington

Tennis
Anthony Wilding won the men's singles at the Wimbledon Championship

Births
 5 January: Jack Lovelock, athlete
 10 February: Paul Whitelaw, cricketer
 15 March: Norman Douglas, politician.
 27 March: Freda Stark, dancer
 11 April: Mountford T. "Toss" Woollaston, painter and writer
 4 July: Peter McIntyre, painter
 11 August: James Munro Bertram, writer and Rhodes scholar. 
 11 August: Denis 'Sonny' Moloney, cricketer
 8 October: Gordon Innes, rugby union and rugby league player
 18 December: Eric Tindill, cricket and rugby union player
 24 December, William Hayward Pickering, space scientist
 28 December: Jack Kerr, cricketer
 Full date unknown:
 Harold Wilfred Youren, lawyer, farmer, farmers’ advocate and peace campaigner (d. 1983)
:Category:1910 births

Deaths
 14 May: Frederick Baume, politician.
 28 April: Arthur Beauchamp, politician.
 17 May: Thomas Hocken, collector and bibliographer.
 1 June: Richard Reeves, politician.
 16 July: Richard Hobbs, politician.
 27 November: Richard Oliver, politician

See also
History of New Zealand
List of years in New Zealand
Military history of New Zealand
Timeline of New Zealand history
Timeline of New Zealand's links with Antarctica
Timeline of the New Zealand environment

References

External links